Volume One: UnIndian Songs is the first studio album by American rapper and Anticon co-founder Pedestrian. It was released on Anticon in 2005. It features contributions from Doseone, Why?, Sole, and Jel, among others. In 2004, "The Toss & Turn / Arrest the President" was released as a single from the album. The album peaked at number 17 on the Dusted Top 40 Radio Chart.

Critical reception
Louis Vlack of Filter Mini gave the album an 87% rating, describing it as "a daunting collection of (mostly) rapped sermons that manages to pull together three decades of hip-hop music, 40 plus years of world politics, and a century of American poetry." He added: "Know-it-allism never sounded so crunk." Mike Diver of Drowned in Sound gave the album an 8 out of 10, calling it "a breathtaking effort, easily exceeding any pre-release expectations."

Brian Howe of Pitchfork gave the album a 7.4 out of 10, saying, "a large part of Anticon's appeal has been its capacity to surprise, and while Pedestrian's record befuddles, proselytizes, and fascinates, it rarely strays from the established palette." Ron Hart of Billboard said, "Volume One is a fine step in the right direction for these guys, and a fine starting point for those looking to explore this most unique collective."

Track listing

Personnel
Credits adapted from liner notes.

 Pedestrian – vocals
 Jel – vocals (2, 8, 10, 12), production (2, 8, 12)
 Why? – vocals (2, 7, 10, 13), keyboards (3, 4, 7, 13, 14), guitar (7, 13), bass guitar (14), production (3, 4, 7, 13)
 Lucy – vocals (2)
 Henry Davidson – guitar (3, 4)
 Matt Chang – production (3, 4, 7, 10, 11, 13, 14)
 Alias – vocals (6, 10), production (6)
 Doseone – vocals (6, 10)
 Tia – vocals (6)
 Sole – vocals (7, 8, 14)
 Telephone Jim Jesus – guitar (9)
 Passage – vocals (10)
 Jerome Opena – guitar (10)
 Jason Chavez – vocals (13)
 Kaaj – vocals (14)
 Shorty the Cat – vocals (14)
 Moshe – saxophone (14)

References

External links
 
 

2005 debut albums
Anticon albums
Hip hop albums by American artists
Albums produced by Alias (musician)
Albums produced by Jel (music producer)